Trevor Adair ( 1961 – 28 October 2020) was the head coach of the Clemson Tigers men's soccer team. He coached at the collegiate level from 1982, after playing soccer at Lock Haven University.

Player
Adair was born in Belfast, Northern Ireland. Michael Parker, men's soccer head coach at Lock Haven University, recruited him, and he played four seasons, 1978 to 1981, with the Eagles. In 1978, Lock Haven won the Division III NCAA Men's Soccer Championship. In 1980, having moved up a division, they won the Division II title. That year, Adair was selected as a first team All American after leading Lock Haven in scoring with sixteen goals. Adair graduated in 1982 with a bachelor's degree in economics.

Coach
Following his graduation from Lock Haven, Adair chose not to pursue a career as a professional player, but to enter the coaching ranks. He moved to the University of South Carolina where he was an assistant coach for nine seasons. Adair moved to Brown University, becoming the men's soccer head coach in November 1990. In his four seasons at Brown, he compiled a 34–24–5 record. In 1993, Adair spent time as an assistant coach with the U.S. U-18 national team. In 1995, Clemson hired Adair as head coach to the men's soccer team. Through 2007, Adair has a 160–71–23 record, having been named the 1998 ACC Coach of the Year in addition to taking the Tigers to the 2005 Final Four. At some point during his career, Adair has also served as an assistant with the United States U-20 men's national soccer team. In April 2009, Clemson placed Adair on a leave of absence after he reportedly assaulted his two daughters during a domestic dispute. Adair resigned as coach on June 14, 2009.

Death
Adair died on 28 October 2020, aged 59.

References

External links
 Clemson Tigers

1960s births
2020 deaths
Year of birth missing
Association footballers from Northern Ireland
Lock Haven University of Pennsylvania alumni
Brown Bears men's soccer coaches
Clemson Tigers men's soccer coaches
Expatriate soccer players in the United States
Football managers from Northern Ireland
Expatriate association footballers from Northern Ireland
British emigrants to the United States
Association footballers from Belfast
South Carolina Gamecocks men's soccer coaches
Ulster Scots people
All-American men's college soccer players
Association footballers not categorized by position